Anne Bouillon is a French lawyer born in 1972 specializing in women's rights. She is registered with the bar of Nantes. According to GQ she was the most powerful lawyer in France in 2019.

Anne Bouillon was sworn in in January 2001 before the Aix-en-Provence Court of Appeal. She began her career in Marseille in immigration and employee law before setting up her own law firm in Nantes in 2003. Her commitment to the defense of women victims of domestic violence, which she made her specialty, and her involvement in feminist associations propelled her to the fore.

Her testimony on legal issues relating to the care of women victims of violence by the justice system is regularly the subject of national (La Croix, Liberation, etc.) and regional (West France) press.

Personal life 
Anne Bouillon is the great-niece of Josephine Baker and her fourth husband, Jo Bouillon, she is also the niece of director Gilles Bouillon and the cousin of actor Bastien Bouillon. She is the mother of a child and married to criminal lawyer Franck Boëzec.

Documentary 
2023: Anne Bouillon: Justice for all!, directed by Dylan Besseau

Notes and references

References

1972 births
Living people
French women lawyers
21st-century French lawyers
21st-century women lawyers